Paulo Rui Lino Borges, known as Lino (born 21 July 1971) is a former Portuguese football player of Angolan descent.

He played 9 seasons and 225 games in the Primeira Liga for Chaves, Braga and Sporting de Espinho.

Club career
He made his Primeira Liga debut for Chaves on 30 September 1990 as a starter in a 1–1 draw against Vitória de Setúbal.

References

1971 births
People from Mirandela
Portuguese sportspeople of Angolan descent
Living people
Portuguese footballers
Association football defenders
G.D. Chaves players
Primeira Liga players
Liga Portugal 2 players
S.C. Braga players
S.C. Espinho players
Sportspeople from Bragança District